Ahoora Behbahan Futsal Club (Bashgah-e Futsal-e Ahura Behebehan) is an Iranian professional futsal club based in Behbahan.

Season by season

The table below chronicles the achievements of the Club in various competitions.

Last updated: May 1, 2021

Honours 
 Iran Futsal's 1st Division
 Runners-up (1): 2017–18
 Iran Futsal's 2nd Division
 Winners (1): 2017

Players

Current squad

Personnel

Current technical staff

Last updated: 17 February 2022

References 

Futsal clubs in Iran
Sport in Khuzestan Province
2011 establishments in Iran
Futsal clubs established in 2011